Bordeaux Montaigne University (French: Université Bordeaux Montaigne; formerly Université Michel de Montaigne Bordeaux 3) is a public university in Pessac, France, approximately 8 kilometres (5 miles) southwest of the city centre of Bordeaux. 

It forms part of the ComUE d'Aquitaine university group.

History
Bordeaux Montaigne University was established in 1970 after a restructuring of public universities in and near the city of Bordeaux. The university was known as Université de Bordeaux 3 during its first two decades. In 1990, it took on the name of philosopher Michel de Montaigne who was a native of the modern-day Nouvelle-Aquitaine region, becoming Université Michel de Montaigne Bordeaux 3. In 2014, the university's name was simplified to Université Bordeaux Montaigne after the universities of Bordeaux 1, 2, and 4 were all merged together to become the University of Bordeaux. Bordeaux Montaigne University celebrated its 50th anniversary in 2020.

Curricula and syllabi
The university provides bachelors, vocational bachelors, masters, and doctoral degrees in the arts, linguistics, management and humanities, abiding by the European Bologna process, and thus complying with the European Credit Transfer System. The university conducts substantial research in all of these disciplines. 

Bordeaux Montaigne University also offers certificates such as DAEU and DUT.

A double-degree (for example in Law and Languages) is possible with the Montesquieu University or other Bordeaux Higher Education Institutes. 

Evening classes in additional languages or in rarer languages (cantonese, etc.) are also available.

Faculties, Schools and Doctoral College 
The Doctoral College Montaigne-Humanités (literally: "Montaigne Humanities" is the largest doctoral college on the Bordeaux Universities campus and one of the largest in France. It is also referred to as Ecole doctorale "unique" (literally: Sole Doctoral College), as it is an conglomerate of several research fields and other doctoral colleges in humanities, which were once apart.

Campus and student life
Bordeaux Montaigne University conducts most of its teaching and research on the campus in Pessac. However, the journalism and technology institutes are located in the city centre of Bordeaux, and there are small teaching sites located in the towns of Agen and Bayonne.

The university has several CROUS residence halls, dining halls, and cafés available to students. There is also a student union on the Pessac campus and numerous student organisations that students may join, including a sports association.

International students comprise 8 percent of the student body.

Notable faculty
 Robert Escarpit (1918-2000) - specialist in English literature
 Joseph Pérez (1931-2020) - historian specialising in Spanish history
 Jean-Claude Golvin (born 1942) - archaeologist and architect
 Abdellah Bounfour (born 1946) - Moroccan linguist and philologist specialised in Berber languages, literature and culture. 
 Béatrice Galinon-Mélénec (born 1949) - semiotician specialising in the anthropology of communication 
 Hélène Velasco-Graciet - geographer; president of the Bordeaux Montaigne University from 2016 to 2020
 Emmanuel Bourdieu (born 1965) - writer, playwright, film director and philosopher; son of Pierre Bourdieu

Notable alumni
 Lucien Xavier Michel-Andrianarahinjaka (1929-1997) - Malagasy writer, poet, and politician 
 Ignacio Ramonet (born 1943) - Spanish academic, journalist and writer; editor-in-chief of Le Monde diplomatique 1991-2008 
 Julie Okoh (born 1947) - Nigerian playwright, educator and feminist activist
 Gong Yuanxing (born 1952) - Chinese diplomat
 Rodolphe Alexandre (born 1953) - politician from Guyane (French Guiana)
 Ioannis Liritzis (born 1953) - Greek academic 
 Alice Yaeger Kaplan (born 1954) - American literary critic, translator, historian, and educator
 Simplice Sarandji (born 1955) - former Prime Minister of Central African Republic
 Mohamed Toihiri (born 1955) - Permanent Representative to the United Nations for Comoros
 Stéphan Perreau (born 1969) - contemporary musician and art historian
 Stéphane Bijoux (born 1970) - politician 
 Nafissatou Dia Diouf (born 1973) - Senegalese writer
 Yann Barthès (born 1974) - journalist, TV presenter and producer
 Éric Poulliat (born 1974) - politician
 Celia Ross - former president of Algoma University, Canada
 Benoît Maire (born 1978) - visual artist who works in film, sculpture, painting, photography, collage, and performance art
 Marzena Sowa (born 1979) - cartoonist from Poland
 Aimal Faizi (born 1979) - Afghan journalist and columnist; spokesperson of Afghanistan's President Hamid Karzai 2011-2014
 Marlyse Baptista - linguist specialising in morphology, syntax, pidgin and creole languages
 Fabien Gay (born 1984) - politician
 Benjamin Hoffmann (born 1985) - creative writer and professor 
 Manouchka Kelly Labouba - Gabonese filmmaker and screenwriter
 Antoinette Tidjani Alou - lecturer in Comparative Literature at Abdou Moumouni University, Niger

See also
List of public universities in France by academy
Michel de Montaigne
University of Bordeaux

References

External links
Official website 

 
3